Statistics of Swiss Super League in the 1914–15 season.

East

Central A

Central B

West

Semifinals

|colspan="3" style="background-color:#D0D0D0" align=center|2 May 1915

|-
|colspan="3" style="background-color:#D0D0D0" align=center|30 May 1915

|}

Final

|colspan="3" style="background-color:#D0D0D0" align=center|6 June 1915

|}

Brühl St. Gallen won the championship.

Sources 
 Switzerland 1914-15 at RSSSF

Seasons in Swiss football
Swiss Football League seasons
1914–15 in Swiss football
Swiss